SMG may refer to:

Organizations
 Macao Meteorological and Geophysical Bureau, Direcção dos Serviços Meteorológicos e Geofisicos
 Science Museum Group, UK
 Scottish Minorities Group, later Outright Scotland
 SGM Light, a Danish manufacturer of LED lighting 
 SMG plc, later STV Group plc, Scotland
 SMG (property management)
 SMG Studio, game developer based in Sydney, Australia
 Southall Monitoring Group
 Spaceflight Meteorology Group, US
 Starcom Mediavest Group
 Suzuki Motor Gujarat
 UN Senior Management Group

Media
 Shanghai Media Group
 Scandinavian Music Group, a Finnish pop/rock band
 Sex Machineguns, a Japanese metal band
 Super Mario Galaxy, a video game

Transport
 St Margarets railway station (London), by National Rail station code
 Sumang LRT station, Singapore, by LRT station abbreviation

Other uses
 Stoke Mandeville Games, a yearly recurring sports event started in 1948 in UK, that later became international and recognized as the Summer Paralympic Games every 4 years since 1976
 Santa Monica 13, a gang
 Sarah Michelle Gellar, American actress
 Sequential manual gearbox, BMW automated manual transmission
 Submachine gun
 Sister Machine Gun, American industrial rock music ensemble
 The Screen Management Services (SMG$) API in OpenVMS

See also

 
 SMGS (disambiguation)